Donte Grantham (Born March 19, 1995) is an American basketball player for SLUC Nancy Basket of the LNB Pro A. He played college basketball for Clemson University.

College career
Grantham competed for the Clemson Tigers, averaging 8.8 points per game as a freshman and 10.2 points per game as a sophomore. His scoring fell to 7.3 points per game as a junior. He averaged 14.2 points and 6.9 rebounds per game as a senior. Grantham suffered a torn ACL in a game against Notre Dame on January 21, 2018, prematurely ending his college career.

Professional career

Oklahoma City Blue (2018)
After going undrafted in the 2018 NBA draft, Grantham signed with the Oklahoma City Thunder on October 10, 2018. but was later waived two days later. Grantham was later included in the training camp roster of the Oklahoma City Blue.

Oklahoma City Thunder (2018–2019)
After beginning his professional career with the Oklahoma City Blue of the NBA G League, Grantham was signed to a two-way contract by the Oklahoma City Thunder on December 28, 2018. Grantham made his NBA debut with the Thunder on February 7, 2019, playing in only two minutes of action under a blowout 117–95 win over the Memphis Grizzlies. On July 25, 2019, Grantham was waived by the Oklahoma City Thunder.

Agua Caliente Clippers (2019–2021)
On August 28, 2019, Grantham signed an Exhibit 10 contract with the Los Angeles Clippers. For the 2019–20 season, Grantham joined the Agua Caliente Clippers of the G League. On December 15, Grantham posted 25 points, nine rebounds, two assists and a steal in a loss to the Santa Cruz Warriors.

Champagne Châlons-Reims (2021–2022)
On July 22, 2021, he has signed with Champagne Châlons-Reims of the LNB Pro A.

SLUC Nancy (2022–present)
On June 11, 2022, he has signed with SLUC Nancy Basket of the LNB Pro A.

Career statistics

NBA

Regular season

|-
| style="text-align:left;"| 
| style="text-align:left;"| Oklahoma City
| 3 || 0 || 0.7 || .000 || .000 || – || .0 || .0 || .0 || .0 || 0.0
|- class="sortbottom"
| style="text-align:center;" colspan="2"| Career
| 3 || 0 || 0.7 || .000 || .000 || – || .0 || .0 || .0 || .0 || 0.0

References

External links
Clemson Tigers bio

1995 births
Living people
Agua Caliente Clippers players
American men's basketball players
Basketball players from West Virginia
Champagne Châlons-Reims Basket players
Clemson Tigers men's basketball players
Oklahoma City Blue players
Oklahoma City Thunder players
SLUC Nancy Basket players
Small forwards
Sportspeople from Martinsburg, West Virginia
Undrafted National Basketball Association players